Antonio Galardo (born 18 September 1976) is a former Italian professional footballer who played as a midfielder.

Career 
He began his football career in youth squad of Sporting Crotone, second team of the city. Then he went to Crotone.

From 1998 to 2001 he played in Eccellenza with La Sportiva Cariatese and Rossanese.

Since 2002 is in force at Crotone. He became the team's captain during the 2011–12 season.

External links 

Italian footballers
F.C. Crotone players
Serie B players
Serie C players
Serie D players
Association football midfielders
People from Crotone
1976 births
Living people
Footballers from Calabria
Sportspeople from the Province of Crotone